Crest Whitestrips is a line of tooth whitening products made by Procter & Gamble.

Description
Crest Whitestrips were introduced in 2001. The product is used by placing a disposable plastic strip directly onto the teeth that contains an enamel-safe whitening gel. It is reported to be most effective on yellow and heavily stained teeth.

In 2010, the "3D" range of Whitestrips was introduced. The new "Advanced Seal" was a technological advancement from the older Crest Whitestrips. The strips are now non-slip, and also whiten more teeth because each strip is longer. These are available with the strongest retail 3D Advanced Vivid and 3D Professional Effects Whitestrips.

U.S. dentists also offer a specialized Crest Whitestrips called "Supreme", which is more effective than retail versions due to the higher concentration of hydrogen peroxide.

Possible side effects from Whitestrips usage include gum irritation and white spots on the teeth for a few hours after use. Sensitivity can also temporarily occur. Whitestrips can also have a bleaching effect if they come in contact with clothing or skin. Whitestrips are not for use by children under the age of 18. The active ingredient is hydrogen peroxide. 

According to a 2009 article in The Washington Post, Consumer Reports found Crest Whitestrips Supreme to be the best of the eight teeth whitening products it tested. This product was the most expensive kit tested by Consumer Reports.

Ingredients
Crest Whitestrips contain water, glycerin, hydrogen peroxide, carbomer 956, and sodium saccharin. Crest Whitestrips Professional Effects (Hong Kong Version) contains water, glycerin, carbomer 956, sodium hydroxide, and sodium saccharin.

Usage 
Crest 3D White Whitestrips only whiten natural teeth. The strips do not whiten caps, crowns, veneers, fillings or dentures. They are not to be used with dental braces, loose teeth or temporary or loose restorations. Crest recommends that if customers are in need of dental work, have had dental work or have staining from medication, they ask a dentist if tooth whitening is appropriate.

Summary of products

Strengths available
 Crest Whitestrips Supreme has 100 mg of gel with 14% hydrogen peroxide (14 mg) of hydrogen peroxide per upper strip.
 Crest Whitestrips Professional has 200 mg of gel with 6.5% hydrogen peroxide per upper strip.
 Crest Whitestrips Professional Effects (Hong Kong Version) has 200 mg of gel with (14 mg) of sodium hydroxide as active ingredient.

See also
Crest (toothpaste)
Tooth bleaching
Listerine
Cosmetic dentistry

References

External links
Crest Official website

Procter & Gamble brands